Tiane Doan na Champassak (born August 19, 1973) is a French artist of Asian descent best known for his photo-based works and artists' books.

After a prolific collaboration as a photographer with Agence Vu during which he was awarded a World Press Photo, a Prix Roger Pic, and grants from the Jean-Luc Lagardère Foundation and Villa Medici, Doan na Champassak shifted his attention to photography as a contemporary art form. The main focus of his work is exploring various aspects of sexuality, such as ambiguity and censorship, by processing, reusing and juxtaposing materials from multiple sources.

In the last 15 years, he published a large number of artists' books that have become part of important private and public collections such as The Getty Research Institute, The International Center of Photography, Centre Pompidou, Maison Européenne de la Photographie, and Tate Modern.

Publications

Films
 Natpwe, the feast of the spirits, Tiane Doan Na Champassak and Jean Dubrel, 2012 – Winner of the 2012 Scribe Prize for Cinema and Best Short Documentary CIDFF 2013. Official selection TIFF 2013, NYFF 2013, Festcurtas Belo Horizonte 2013, DOCLISBOA 2013 and IDFA 2013.

Exhibitions
 Censored, Fflag, Turin, October 2020
 The Hoodie, Het Nieuwe Instituut, Rotterdam, November 2019
 Sunless and Corpus, Résidence 1+2 Toulouse, November 2018
 Corpus, ISelf Collection: Bumped Bodies, Whitechapel Gallery, London, April 2018
 Spleen and Ideal, Eyes Wild Open, Museum of Botanique, Bruxelles, February 2018
 Censored, Polka Gallery, Paris Photo, November 2016
 Public, Private, Secret (Looters), ICP Museum, New York, USA, June 2016
 Siam’s Guy, RVB Books Gallery, Paris, France, June 2016
 Sunless, Silencio, Paris, France, April 2016
 Looters – Strange and Familiar: Britain as Revealed by International Photographers, Barbican, London, March 2016
 Abstracts – AM Projects, Galerie Honoré, Paris, France, October 2015
 Sunless, Polka Gallery, Paris, France, September 2015
 Abstracts – AM Projects, Copperfield Gallery, London, UK, May 2015
 Looters, Format International Photography Festival, Derby, UK, March 2015
 Fieret + Tiane, Kahmann Gallery, Amsterdam, The Netherlands, December 2014
 Dick999, East Wing Gallery, Paris Photo, France, November 2014
 Looters, Galerie Les Yeux Ouverts, Fontainebleau, October 2014
 Sunless, Kahmann Gallery, PAN Amsterdam, The Netherlands, November 2013
 Sunless, Kahmann Gallery, Unseen Photo Fair Amsterdam, The Netherlands, September 2013
 Looters, East Wing Gallery, Unseen Photo Fair Amsterdam, The Netherlands, September 2013
 Showroom – Spleen and Ideal, The Copper House Gallery, Dublin, Ireland, June 2013
 Looters, LWS Gallery, Paris, France, May 2013
 Spleen and Ideal, East Wing Gallery, Paris Photo, November 2012
 Spleen and Ideal, East Wing Gallery, Unseen Photo Fair Amsterdam, The Netherlands, September 2012
 Between the Lines, Croxhapox, Ghent, Belgium, May 2012
 Crossing Lalibela, Dumbarton Oaks Museum, Washington, DC June – October 2011
 Kolkata, Metropolis 2.0, The Empty Quarter Gallery, Dubai, UAE, October 2011
 Kolkata, Noorderlicht Photofestival 2011, The Netherlands, September 2011
 Corpus, Kahmann Gallery, Amsterdam, Netherlands, June 2009
 Eunuchs, Angkor Photography Festival, Cambodia, November 2007
 Credo - India, Noorderlicht Photofestival 2007, The Netherlands, September 2007
 Un/Mill à 2.8, Maison Européenne de la Photographie, Paris, November 2006
 Ecstasy Images’04, Vevey, Switzerland, September 2004
 Perspectives on Ten New European Capitals, Avenue des Champs-Elysées, Paris, May 2004

References

1973 births
Living people
French artists
French contemporary artists